Yvonne Godard (3 March 1908 – 22 September 1975) was a French swimmer who won a gold and a bronze medal at the 1931 European Championships in the 100 m and 400 m freestyle. She competed in these events at the 1932 Summer Olympics and finished fifth in the 400 m.

References

1908 births
1975 deaths
People from Douai
Olympic swimmers of France
Swimmers at the 1932 Summer Olympics
European Aquatics Championships medalists in swimming
Sportspeople from Nord (French department)
French female freestyle swimmers
20th-century French women